A trilogy is a set of three dramatic or literary works.

Trilogy may also refer to:

Business
Trilogy (company), a technology consulting company based in Austin, Texas
Trilogy Education Services, an education technology company
Trilogy International Partners, an American wireless telecommunications company
Trilogy Systems, a failed startup company founded by Gene Amdahl
Viva (network operator), a Dominican mobile network operator formerly known as Trilogy Dominicana

Music

Albums
The Cure: Trilogy, a live performance DVD by The Cure
III - Tri-Logy (album), an album by the Finnish group Kingston Wall
Trill OG, an album by Bun B
Trilogy: Past Present Future, a 1980 triple album by Frank Sinatra
Trilogy (ATB album), 2007
Trilogy (Emerson, Lake & Palmer album)
Trilogy (Enigma album), a compilation album by Enigma
Trilogy (Faderhead album), a compilation album by Faderhead
Trilogy (The Weeknd album), a compilation album by The Weeknd 
Trilogy (Yngwie Malmsteen album)
Trilogy (Chick Corea album), 2013
Trilogy (Ana Popović album), 2016
 The Trilogy (album)

Other music
Trilogy (group), a freestyle music group from New York City, USA
"Trilogy," a three-song suite by Sonic Youth from the album Daydream Nation
Trilogy polyphonic synthesizer, manufactured by Crumar in the 1980s

Other
Set Enterprises, who invented the board game "Trilogy"
The Trilogy, the series of three novels written by the Polish author Henryk Sienkiewicz
Trilogy (basketball), the 3-on-3 basketball team that plays in the BIG3
Trilogy (film), a 1969 film
"Trilogy" (Quantum Leap), an episode of the TV show Quantum Leap